Hanes 500 may refer to the following NASCAR races at Martinsville Speedway:

 Blu-Emu Maximum Pain Relief 500 , (from 1991 to 1995)
 First Data 500, (From 1996 to 1997)